Matthew Clay Mumme (born May 15, 1975) is an American college football coach who is currently the quarterbacks coach and associate head coach for the Colorado State Rams. He was head coach of the LaGrange Panthers from 2013 to 2016.

Coaching career
Mumme was head coach of NCAA Division III LaGrange from 2013 to 2016. LaGrange led the USA South Athletic Conference in passing in all three of his full seasons as head coach, averaging 339.1 passing yards per game.

Mumme was hired as Nevada's offensive coordinator following the conclusion of the 2016 season at LaGrange. He coached under head coach Jay Norvell and helped develop quarterback Carson Strong into a two-time Mountain West Conference Offensive Player of the Year and NFL Draft prospect.

Following the conclusion of Nevada's 2021 season, head coach Jay Norvell was hired by Colorado State to be their next head coach. Mumme followed Norvell to Colorado State, taking the offensive coordinator position. Colorado State branded the hire and resulting recruiting class as "Fort Air Raid", a nod to Colorado State's home, Fort Collins, CO, and the new, pass-heavy offensive style brought by Mumme and Norvell.

Personal life
Mumme is the son of longtime coach and "Air Raid" innovator Hal Mumme.

Head coaching record

Notes

References

External links
 Colorado State profile
 Davidson profile

1975 births
Living people
American football quarterbacks
Colorado State Rams football coaches
Davidson Wildcats football coaches
Kentucky Wildcats football players
LaGrange Panthers football coaches
McMurry War Hawks football coaches
Nevada Wolf Pack football coaches
New Mexico State Aggies football coaches
Southeastern Louisiana Lions football coaches
Southeastern Louisiana University alumni
People from Erath County, Texas